Klindworth or Klintworth may refer to the following people:

Klindworth:
 Johann Andreas Klindworth (1742–1813), German watchmaker and court mechanic
 Carl August Klindworth, 19th century German mechanic and entrepreneur, son of Johann Klindworth
 Karl Klindworth (1830–1917), German composer, pianist, conductor, violinist and music publisher, son of Carl Klindworth
 Georg Klindworth (1798–1882), German diplomat and intelligence agent, son of Johann Klindworth and brother of Carl Klindworth
 Agnes Street-Klindworth (1825–1906), illegitimate daughter of Georg Klindworth and lover of the composer Franz Liszt
 Johann Klindworth (1900–1976), German politician, Christian Democratic Union member of the Landtag of Lower Saxony
 Steve Klindworth, founder of SuperCircuits, an audio and video surveillance company in Texas, U.S.

Klintworth:
 Gordon K. Klintworth (1932–2014), American professor of ophthalmology and pathology 
 Kimberly Perkins Klintworth, American journalist and main host of the television program Profiles in Caring

See also
 Klindworth-Scharwenka Conservatory

Low German surnames